The Elfin MS8 Clubman is a sports car, successor to the Elfin MS7, a Repco-Holden V8 powered Group A Sports Car which won the 1975 Australian Sports Car Championship and the 1976 Australian Tourist Trophy.

Sales started in July 2006 with the Streamliner selling for $119,990 and the Clubman for $98,990.  Production will be approximately 100 per year between the two models. UK sales began in April 2007, with importing handled by Walkinshaw Performance.

Design
The Elfin MS8 Clubman model has been designed by Elfin Sports Cars and styled by the Holden Design team when Mike Simcoe was Styling Director. The cars were revealed at the 2004 Melbourne International Motor Show.

Specification levels
The Clubman comes in three specifications: Sportster, Roadster and Racer. All are open wheeled configuration. The Sportster is a road registered entry level model with small aeroscreen. The Roadster adds to the Sportster model a full windscreen, removable door panels and two-piece tonneau and the Racer model is a single seat racer for track only.

Performance
Top speed 
standing  - 12.5 s
0 -  in 4.4 seconds

Technical specifications and features

Drivetrain
5.7 litre alloy Generation III V8 OHV 16 valves
From 
6 speed gearbox
Limited Slip Differential (LSD)

Safety
Traction control system
ABS braking system
Cruise control

Suspension
Fully independent rear suspension with top and bottom wishbones plus toe link adjustment
Front suspension with top and bottom chrome moly, unequal, aerofoil wishbones
Fully adjustable race spec rose joints throughout
Elfin alloy uprights (front and rear), fully adjustable for camber, caster & toe
Coil over Koni shock absorbers, adjustable for bump, rebound and ride height

Brakes
Slotted & ventilated 4 wheel disc brakes Front: 32 x  discs
Elfin alloy billet machined 6 pot calipers Rear: 18 x  discs with handbrake
Elfin alloy billet machined 4 pot calipers

Steering/Pedals
Rack and pinion with adjustable steering column
Fully adjustable alloy pedal box with brake bias adjustment

Wheels/Tyres
Alloy 18" wheels
235 x 40 tyres

Construction
Jig assembled, hand crafted multitubular space frame
GRP body panels

Dimensions
Length 
Front Track  	
Width 
Rear Track 
Wheelbase 
Kerb Weight

Notes

External links
Official Site
Video of Elfin Clubman and Streamliner MS8s

Cars of Australia
Clubman
Lotus Seven replicas